Naseem Ahmed was a member of the Haryana Legislative Assembly from the Indian National Lok Dal represented the Ferozepur Jhirka Vidhan sabha Constituency in Haryana from 2014 to 2019. He joined Bharatiya Janata Party just before 2019 Haryana Legislative Assembly election.

References 

People from Nuh district
Indian National Lok Dal politicians
Members of the Haryana Legislative Assembly
Living people
21st-century Indian politicians
Haryana politicians
Year of birth missing (living people)
Bharatiya Janata Party politicians from Haryana